Stephen Hales (died 1574) was an English politician.

He was a Member (MP) of the Parliament of England for Great Bedwyn in 1563 and Leicester in 1571.

References

Year of birth missing
1574 deaths
English MPs 1563–1567
English MPs 1571